Simay Barlas (born 7 May 1999) is a Turkish actress.

Barlas is a graduate of Istanbul Bilgi University with a degree in Cinema and Television studies. She made her television debut in 2014 with a role in the TV series Paramparça. She then continued her career in television with recurring roles in youth series "Adı Efsane", "Hayat Bazen Tatlıdır". Between 2019–2020, she had a leading role in Kanal D drama series Zalim İstanbul. In 2019, she made her cinematic debut with the comedy movie Dijital Esaret.

Filmography

Television

Film

References

External links 
 
 

Living people
1999 births
Turkish television actresses
Turkish film actresses
Actresses from Istanbul
21st-century Turkish actresses
Istanbul Bilgi University alumni